Jorge "Gia" Terceiro (born July 19, 1976) is a Brazilian beach volleyball player representing Georgia.

Team Geor – Gia
Brazilians Jorge "Gia" Terceiro and his teammate Renato "Geor" Gomes represented Georgia at the 2008 Summer Olympics in Beijing, China.

References 
 Profile at the Beach Volleyball Database

1976 births
Living people
Brazilian men's beach volleyball players
Beach volleyball players from Georgia (country)
Beach volleyball players at the 2008 Summer Olympics
Olympic beach volleyball players of Georgia (country)